Mr. O was a Canadian children's music television series which aired on CBC Television from 1956 to 1957.

Premise
This series on classical music was hosted by David Ouchterlony, with soprano Manley Stark. It was geared towards children aged between five and eight, compared to Ouchterlony's previous series Let's Make Music which was geared towards older children. Episodes featured puppet characters operated by John and Linda Keogh such as Cellini (a cello), Clarence (a clarinet) and Whisper. The characters were voiced by Len Davidson and Pegi Loder. Games, stories and songs were also featured on Mr. O.

Scheduling
This 15-minute series was broadcast Thursdays at 4:30 p.m. (Eastern) from 5 April to 21 June 1956. It was then broadcast for a full season on Thursdays at 5:15 p.m. from 4 October 1956 to 4 July 1957.

References

External links
 

CBC Television original programming
1950s Canadian children's television series
1956 Canadian television series debuts
1957 Canadian television series endings
Black-and-white Canadian television shows
Canadian television shows featuring puppetry